Roberto Maldonado is the alderman of the 26th Ward of the City of Chicago, Illinois.

Early life, education, and early career, Children 

Maldonado earned both his undergraduate and his master's degree from the University of Puerto Rico. In Chicago, Maldonado continued his education at Loyola University Chicago where he intended to earn a doctorate of philosophy in clinical psychology.

Roberto has one child named Roberto ll, he currently attends Ogden International High School. In 1986 Maldonado briefly was married to the sister of Luis Gutiérrez, United States Representative and former 26th ward alderman. Maldonado was an employee of Gutiérrez's 1986 aldermanic campaign and of Gutiérrez's 1987 re-election campaign. Maldonado worked as school psychologist. Maldonado worked as a research analyst to the Mayor’s Commission on Latino Affairs. In 1988 Maldonado was Director of Management Services for the Mayor's Office of Employment Training, the agency's top purchasing official, in charge of the office's $1 million annual purchasing budget. Maldonado doled out hundreds of thousands of dollars in business to companies owned by people in Gutierrez's Puerto Rican political circle, then solicited campaign contributions for Gutierrez from those and other Office of Employment and Training vendors. Maldonado resigned the City post days after the publication of an investigative report by the Chicago Sun-Times.

Cook County Commissioner 

Maldonado’s election in 1994 as Cook County Commissioner made him the first Puerto Rican in the nation to serve as a county commissioner.

As a commissioner, Maldonado was Chairperson of the Stroger and Cermak Hospitals, and Law Enforcement and Corrections Committees. Additionally, he served on nine committees: Business and Economic Development, Contract Compliance, Labor, Real Estate, Department of Corrections, Health and Hospitals, Finance, Zoning and Buildings, and Roads and Bridges.

Chicago Alderman 

On July 28, 2009, Maldonado was appointed by Chicago Mayor Daley as the alderman for Chicago's 26th Ward.

Maldonado owns more real estate than any other alderman, with 16 properties (including ten in the 26th Ward), according to financial disclosure statements.

In 2013, Maldonado generated controversy through his efforts to convert Ames Middle School into a Marines academy.  The school board ultimately approved the proposal despite significant local opposition.

In 2015, despite majority local support of the Riot Fest music festival, Maldonado vocally opposed allowing the event to continue using Humboldt Park.  The festival ultimately relocated to North Lawndale.

In 2017, a video surfaced of Maldonado confronting police officers at a crime scene in his neighborhood, and attempting to use his status as an alderman to have police allow him to drive through an active crime scene. In the video, the alderman's response to the officers not allowing him to drive through the crime scene was “You know what? This why the Police Department in such bad shape with the citizens.” Maldonado later filed a complaint accusing the officers of "rude and discourteous" behavior towards him.

In 2019, he was selected as the chairman of the Council's Latino Caucus by his fellow caucus members.

Running for Congress 

Maldonado announced in 2007 his intention to run in 2008 for the congressional seat expected to be vacated by U.S. Rep. Luis Gutiérrez (D-Ill.). He raised $230,000 before Gutiérrez decided to run again.  Maldonado bowed out of the race and said he'd keep the money for a 2010 congressional bid.

References

External links
Citizens for Maldonado political action committee website

1953 births
21st-century American politicians
American politicians of Puerto Rican descent
Hispanic and Latino American politicians
Chicago City Council members
Living people
Members of the Cook County Board of Commissioners
University of Puerto Rico alumni
Chicago City Council members appointed by Richard M. Daley